Lane is a lunar impact crater. It lies on the far side of the Moon, just to the west of the crater Ten Bruggencate. It was named after American astrophysicist Jonathan H. Lane. To the west of Lane is Perepelkin, and to the northwest lies Love.

This crater is not heavily eroded, but the rim is somewhat disrupted at the northern and southern ends. To the south the rim has a prominent outward bulge that extends an extra 5–10 km. The interior is somewhat uneven, with low central ridges near the midpoint.

Satellite craters
By convention these features are identified on lunar maps by placing the letter on the side of the crater midpoint that is closest to Lane.

References

External links

Lane at The Moon Wiki

Impact craters on the Moon